Alexander Toft Søderlund (born 3 August 1987) is a Norwegian professional footballer who plays as a forward for Haugesund. He has represented the Norway national team.

Club career
After playing for Stegaberg IL in his youth, Søderlund played for Haugesund and Vard Haugesund. He later became something of a journeyman, spending time at six different clubs in four different foreign countries between 2008 and 2010 (notably in the third italian division, fourth italian division and Belgian Second Division).

His unsuccessful experience abroad ended in summer 2010, when the fourth italian division club of Calcio Lecco did not renew his probation period of 4 months.

He then returned home, and played for his former club Vard Haugesund (Norwegian Second Division) in the closing stages of the 2010 season.

In January 2011, he moved to FK Haugesund, and on 20 March 2011, Søderlund made his debut in Tippeligaen against Tromsø. He got his first two league goals against Stabæk on 8 May 2011, and finished his debut season with 11 goals.

On 17 June 2013, Rosenborg BK announced that they had bought Søderlund from Haugesund as a replacement for Tarik Elyounoussi who was sold to the German Bundesliga. Søderlund joined the club on 15 July. He played 12 matches and scored three goals for Haugesund in the 2013 season, and as the club eventually finished in third place in Tippeligaen for the first time in the club's history, Søderlund was eligible for bronze medals. But as his new team Rosenborg finished second, he was only awarded silver medals due to a change in the rules after Thomas Holm won both gold and silver with two different teams in the 2011 season. Søderlund won another silver-medal in 2013, as Rosenborg lost the 2013 Norwegian Football Cup Final 4–2 against Molde.

On 4 January 2016, Søderlund joined Saint-Étienne on 3.5-year contract. The transfer fee paid to Rosenborg was estimated at between €1.5 and 2 million. Thirteen days later, he scored his first goal for the club in a 1–0 derby win against Lyon.

Frequently criticized in France for his lack of speed and technique, he was transferred in January 2018 to his former club Rosenborg. The transfer fee paid was estimated at €500,000.

International career
On 23 November 2011, Søderlund was named in the Norway squad for the three friendly matches in Thailand in January 2012. He made his debut for Norway in a 1–1 friendly draw against Denmark on 15 January 2012. On 1 June 2012, he was added to Norway's squad when Mohammed Abdellaoue was doubtful for the match against Croatia. Søderlund got his first cap at home when he replaced Erik Huseklepp as a substitute in the 84th minute, and later assisted Tarik Elyounoussi equalizing goal against Croatia. In the 2014 FIFA World Cup qualifying match against Slovenia on 11 September 2012, he replaced Elyounoussi after 89 minutes earning a penalty three minutes later which John Arne Riise converted for the match-winning goal as Norway won 2–1. He started his first qualifying match when Norway met Switzerland on 12 October 2012.

Career statistics

Club

International goals
Scores and results list Norway's goal tally first, score column indicates score after each Søderlund goal.

Honours

Rosenborg
 Eliteserien: 2015, 2018
 Norwegian Cup: 2015, 2018
 Mesterfinalen: 2018

Individual
Eliteserien Top goalscorer: 2015
Eliteserien Striker of the Year: 2015

References

External links

 

1987 births
Living people
People from Haugesund
Sportspeople from Rogaland
Norwegian footballers
Association football forwards
Norway international footballers
Challenger Pro League players
FK Haugesund players
SK Vard Haugesund players
S.S. Virtus Lanciano 1924 players
Union Royale Namur Fosses-La-Ville players
Fimleikafélag Hafnarfjarðar players
Calcio Lecco 1912 players
Rosenborg BK players
AS Saint-Étienne players
BK Häcken players
Çaykur Rizespor footballers
Eliteserien players
Ligue 1 players
Allsvenskan players
Süper Lig players
Norwegian expatriate footballers
Expatriate footballers in Italy
Norwegian expatriate sportspeople in Italy
Expatriate footballers in Belgium
Norwegian expatriate sportspeople in Belgium
Expatriate footballers in Iceland
Norwegian expatriate sportspeople in Iceland
Expatriate footballers in France
Norwegian expatriate sportspeople in France
Expatriate footballers in Sweden
Norwegian expatriate sportspeople in Sweden
Expatriate footballers in Turkey
Norwegian expatriate sportspeople in Turkey